Aaaaba is a genus of beetles from the Buprestidae family. It inhabits locations along the east coast of Australia. It was described in 1864 by Achille Deyrolle as "Alcinous", a junior homonym of a genus of pycnogonids. In 2002, Charles Bellamy gave it the replacement name "Aaaba", but this proved to be another junior homonym, of a genus of sponges. In 2013, it was given a further replacement name, becoming Aaaaba.

There are two species within this genus:
Aaaaba nodosa (Deyrolle, 1865)
Aaaaba fossicollis (Kerremans, 1903)

The genus name is feminine under ICZN Article 30.2.4 ("If no gender was specified or indicated, the name is to be treated as masculine, except that, if the name ends in -a the gender is feminine").

Distribution 
Species of this genus are found in New South Wales, Queensland and Victoria.

References

Further reading

Bellamy, C. L. 1985. A catalogue of the higher taxa of the family Buprestidae (Coleoptera). Navorsinge van die Nasionale Museum Bloemfontein 4(15): 405–472 [423]
Bellamy, C. L. 1986. The higher classification of Australian Buprestidae with the description of a new genus and species (Coleoptera). Australian Journal of Zoology 34: 583–600 [596]
Bellamy, C. L. 1988. The classification and phylogeny of Australian Coroebini with a revision of the genera Paracephala, Meliboeithon and Dinocephalia. Invertebrate Taxonomy 2(3): 413–453 [417]
Carter, H. J. 1923. Revision of the genera Ethon, Cisseis and their allies (Buprestidae). Proceedings of the Linnean Society of New South Wales 48(2): 159–176 [176]
Carter, H. J. 1929. A check list of the Australian Buprestidae. With tables and keys to sub-families, tribes, and genera (by A. Théry). Australian Zoologist 5(4): 265–304 [276]
Holynski, R. 1993. A reassessment of the internal classification of the Buprestidae Leach (Coleoptera). Crystal, series Zoologica 1: 1–42 [15]
Kerremans, C. 1893. Essai de groupement des Buprestides. Annales de la Société Entomologique de Belgique 37: 94–122 [122]
Kerremans, C. 1898. Buprestides nouveaux de l'Australie et des régiones voisines. Annales de la Société Entomologique de Belgique 42: 113–182 [174]
Kerremans, C. 1903. Coleoptera, Fam. Buprestidae. pp. 49–338 in Wytsman, P. (ed.). Genera Insectorum. Bruxelles : Verteneuil & Desmet Vol. 12b-d [221] (generic characters, checklist)
Obenberger, J. 1935. Buprestidae 4. pp. 785–934 in W. Junk & S. Schenkling (eds). Coleopterorum Catalogus. 's-Gravenhage : W. Junk Vol. 143 [791]
Saunders, E. 1871. Catalogus Buprestidarum Synonymicus et Systematicus. London : Janson pp. 171 [136]
Théry, A. 1929. Classification. 266–275 in Carter, H. J. A checklist of the Australian Buprestidae. Australian Zoologist 5(4): 265–304 [272]
Williams, G. A. 1983. Observations on the genus Alcinous Deyrolle (Coleoptera: Buprestidae). Victorian Naturalist 100: 37–39 [37]
Williams, G. A. 1993. Hidden Rainforests: subtropical rainforests and their invertebrate biodiversity. Kensington, NSW : New South Wales University Press Vol. 1 pp. 188 [37] (host)

Buprestidae genera
Beetles of Australia
Taxa described in 2013